An endpoint, end-point or end point may refer to:

 Endpoint (band), a hardcore punk band from Louisville, Kentucky
 Endpoint (chemistry), the conclusion of a chemical reaction, particularly for titration
 Outcome measure, a measure used as an endpoint in research
 Clinical endpoint, in clinical research, a disease, symptom, or sign that constitutes one of the target outcomes of the trial or its participants
 Communication endpoint, the entity on one end of a transport layer connection
 Endpoint, the lower or upper bound of an interval (mathematics)
 Endpoint, either of the two nodes of an edge in a graph
 Endpoint, either of two extreme points on a line segment
 Endpoint, a function or procedure call that is part of an API in software engineering
 Endpoint security, the security model around end user devices such as PCs, laptops and mobile phones